Franco Ferreiro and André Sá won the first edition of this tournament, defeating Gerald Melzer and José Pereira 6–3, 6–3 in the final.

Seeds

Draw

Draw

References
 Doubles Draw

Santos Brasil Tennis Open - Doubles
2011 Doubles